The 1974–75 FIBA Korać Cup was the fourth edition of FIBA's new competition, running from 5 November 1974 to 25 March 1975. It was contested by 42 teams, five more than in the previous edition.

Birra Forst Cantù defeated CF Barcelona in the final to become the competition's first and only three-peat champion.

Season teams

First round

|}

Second round

|}

Automatically qualified to the round of 16
 Birra Forst Cantù (title holder)
 Dynamo Moscow
 Stroitel

Round of 16
The round of 16 were played with a round-robin system, in which every Two Game series (TGS) constituted as one game for the record.

Semi finals

|}

Finals

|}

References
Linguasport 1974–75 FIBA Korać Cup
1974–75 FIBA Korać Cup

1974–75
1974–75 in European basketball